Antigone Rising is an all-female rock band based in New York City. The band's current line up is Cathy Henderson (lead guitar), Kristen Henderson (bass guitar and drums), and Nini Camps (lead vocals and rhythm guitar).

History
The band originally met at Bucknell University and was formed in Greenwich Village, New York City, with sisters Cathy (guitar) and Kristen Henderson (guitar/drums), Penelope "Peppy" Kokines as lead vocalist and Suzanne Obolsky on vocals and percussion.

In 1999 the band recruited Cassidy as the lead singer.

Their first four albums were recorded mostly with independent labels and financed through fan donations. In 2003, they signed up with Lava Records, a label personally run by Atlantic Records chairman Jason Flom.

In 2005, they became the first artists to be promoted in Starbucks’ Hear Music Series, created to discover and spotlight new music. The high visibility, exclusive sale, in-store promotion and airplay at Starbucks across the United States helped the band's acoustic album, From the Ground Up, sell over 450,000 copies by the end of 2005. The album's single, "Don't Look Back", gained popularity among country audiences after its video received heavy airplay on CMT.

Flom departed Lava in 2005. The band's deal with the label continued, but ended in 2008. A new album, Tales From Wonderland was recorded in 2007, but not released.

In 2008, Cassidy left the band to go solo.  After co-signing a large bank loan to finance the band's final album together, originally titled Tales From Wonderland, Cassidy made several failed attempts to communicate with the band’s remaining members, regarding its release. In 2009, following nearly a year of unanswered calls and attorney letters, Cassidy finally released Tales From Wonderland as Sink Or Swim under the name The Cassidy Project. The other band members were not happy about this, with Kristen Henderson publicly voicing their displeasure. Cassidy herself later referred to this episode as "releasing the hounds" - so she could move on creatively. She also maintains that this was the only option to recover any financial losses and was the last resort following a year of unanswered requests to meet. Two songs were removed from "Sink Or Swim" before its release where Cassidy's name did not appear on the writing credits.  Cassidy now performs going by her full name, Cassidy Catanzaro.

Bass guitarist, Jen Zielenbach, also eventually left. In 2009, Nini Camps, having made several guest appearances with the band, officially joined as the lead singer and rhythm guitarist. Kristen Henderson, now known as Kristen Ellis-Henderson, shifted from rhythm guitar to bass. Also in 2009, both Ellis-Henderson and Camps became mothers to children.

A studio CD, 23 Red, was released in 2011, distributed through Joan Jett's Blackheart Records Group.

The band line up as of 2013 was Kristen Ellis-Henderson on bass guitar and backing vocals, Cathy Henderson on lead guitar and backing vocals, Dena Tauriello on drums and Nini Camps on rhythm guitar and lead vocals.

The band's 2013 single, "That Was The Whiskey", was co-written with the Nashville songwriter Lori McKenna.

In 2014, the band released an EP, Whiskey & Wine Vol. I.

In 2015, the band released another EP, Whiskey & Wine Vol. II.

Touring
In their early years, Antigone Rising toured widely, and have shared stages with the Bangles, Joan Jett, the Rolling Stones, moe., Rob Thomas, Aerosmith, and the Allman Brothers. They performed at the Lilith Fair in 1998 and at SXSW in 2005.

Book
Kristen Ellis Henderson wrote a memoir about her same-sex marriage, Times Two, Two Women in Love and the Happy Family They Made (Simon & Schuster), which was published on April 5, 2011. The book chronicles the journey she and her wife, Sarah Ellis-Henderson, took to start a family - eventually getting pregnant on exactly the same day and giving birth to their son and daughter. The book's success led to them being tapped by GLAAD as media spokeswomen advocating marriage equality, and the couple were featured on the cover of the April 8, 2013 issue of Time magazine - "Gay Marriage Already Won".

Members
 Nini Camps - lead vocals, rhythm guitar
 Kristen Henderson - drums, bass guitar, vocals
  Cathy Henderson - lead guitar, vocals

Discography

Albums
 She's Gone A Little Mad (1996)
 Snapshot (1998)
 New and Used (1999)
 Rock Album (2000)
 SaY iT! an-TIG-uh-nee (2002) (live)
 Antigone Rising's Traveling Circus (2003) (live)
 From the Ground Up (2005) (Hear Music)
 Tales from Wonderland (released as Sink or Swim - The Cassidy Project in 2009)
 Live From NYC (EP) (2010) (recorded live at The Bitter End in NYC, includes one studio track)
 This Christmas (2010) (download only single)
 23 Red (Rising Shine Records) (August 2011)
 Whiskey & Wine, Vol. 1 (EP) (2014)
 Whiskey & Wine, Vol. 2 (EP) (2015)
 True Joy (2022)

Singles
 "Don't Look Back" (from From The Ground Up, May 11, 2005) 
 "This Christmas" (2010)
 "Everywhere Is Home" (from 23 Red, August 5, 2011)
 "That Was The Whiskey" (from Whiskey & Wine, Vol. 1 EP, 2014)

Compilation
 "Fat Bottomed Girls", from the album Killer Queen: A Tribute to Queen (2005)

Videos
Antigone Rising - "Don't Look Back"
Antigone Rising - "No Remedy"
Antigone Rising in Jerusalem and the West Bank
Antigone Rising - "That Was The Whiskey"

References

External links

 
 Antigone Rising on Facebook
 [ Billboard.com review] "From The Ground Up"
 [ Allmusic.com entry]
 Kristen Henderson interview

All-female bands
Rock music groups from New Jersey
Rock music groups from New York (state)
Atlantic Records artists
Women in New York (state)